Malao was an ancient proto-Somali port in present-day Somaliland. The town was situated on the site of what later became the city of Berbera. It was a key trading member involved in the Red Sea-Indian Ocean commerce in the early centuries CE. The town also maintained an important monetary market for merchants exchanging goods in the currencies of the Roman Empire.

History and trade

The ancient port city of Malao was positioned in the historic Somali city of Berbera. It is mentioned in the 1st century CE Periplus of the Erythraean Sea:

Other than Arabia, goods were also purchased and transported to the Greek, Roman and Egyptian empires. Malao gained its high level of trade from its nexus position, by being the closest African port to Arabia and the more peaceful nature of the city, as compared to other potential trade areas.

See also
Mundus
Sarapion
Opone
Mosylon
Essina
Hannassa

References

History of Somaliland
1st century
City-states
African civilizations
Ancient Greek geography of East Africa